HTM may refer to:

Computing
 .htm or .html, file extension for HTML
 Hierarchical temporal memory, a machine learning mode

Other uses
 Held to maturity, an accounting term
 HTM Personenvervoer, The Hague, Netherlands, public transport company 
 Khatgal Airport, Mongolia, IATA code